The 1996 Guangzhou Masters was a non-ranking invitational snooker tournament held by the WPBSA, which took place in February 1996.
The tournament was played in Guangzhou, China, and featured five professional players - Steve Davis, Peter Ebdon, Tony Drago, David Roe and Guo Hua - alongside three Chinese amateurs - He Ching Yi, Pang Weiguo and Tao Yan.

Drago won the tournament, his second and final professional title, beating Davis 6–2 in the final. All of the amateur players lost their opening matches.

Main draw

References

Snooker non-ranking competitions
Snooker competitions in China
1996 in snooker
1996 in Chinese sport